Dirhamphis is a genus of flowering plants belonging to the family Malvaceae.

Its native range is Southern Mexico, Bolivia to Paraguay.

Species:

Dirhamphis balansae 
Dirhamphis mexicana

References

Malveae
Malvaceae genera